Tlaxcoapan is a town and one of the 84 municipalities of Hidalgo, in central-eastern Mexico. The municipality covers an area of 79.3 km².

As of 2005, the municipality had a total population of 26,758. It is now part of Tula de Allende built-up (or metro) area.

Demography

Populated places in Tlaxcoapan

References

Municipalities of Hidalgo (state)
Populated places in Hidalgo (state)
Populated places in the Teotlalpan
Otomi settlements